Héctor Alfredo Coyo Almandoz (born 17 January 1969 in Morón) is an Argentine football manager and former player who played as a defender. He is the current manager of Chilean club Deportes Copiapó.

Personal life
He is married to Silvina Rivero.

References

External links
 
 
 Héctor Almandoz – Argentina Primera statistics at Fútbol XXI 

1969 births
Living people
People from Morón Partido
Argentine footballers
Quilmes Atlético Club footballers
Club Atlético Vélez Sarsfield footballers
Estudiantes de La Plata footballers
San Lorenzo de Almagro footballers
Deportivo Español footballers
Maccabi Haifa F.C. players
De Graafschap players
Santa Cruz Futebol Clube players
Chacarita Juniors footballers
FBC Melgar footballers
Club Aurora players
S.D. Quito footballers
C.D. Jorge Wilstermann players
Club Almirante Brown footballers
Argentine Primera División players
Primera Nacional players
Liga Leumit players
Eredivisie players
Campeonato Brasileiro Série B players
Peruvian Primera División players
Ascenso MX players
Bolivian Primera División players
Ecuadorian Serie A players
Club Atlético Vélez Sarsfield managers
Rangers de Talca managers
Deportes Antofagasta managers
Cobreloa managers
Deportes Copiapó managers
Argentine expatriate footballers
Expatriate footballers in Israel
Expatriate footballers in the Netherlands
Expatriate footballers in Brazil
Expatriate footballers in Peru
Expatriate footballers in Mexico
Expatriate footballers in Bolivia
Expatriate footballers in Ecuador
Expatriate football managers in Chile
Argentine expatriate sportspeople in Israel
Argentine expatriates in Israel
Argentine expatriate sportspeople in the Netherlands
Argentine expatriates in the Netherlands
Argentine expatriate sportspeople in Brazil
Argentine expatriates in Brazil
Argentine expatriate sportspeople in Peru
Argentine expatriates in Peru
Argentine expatriate sportspeople in Mexico
Argentine expatriates in Mexico
Argentine expatriate sportspeople in Bolivia
Argentine expatriates in Bolivia
Argentine expatriate sportspeople in Ecuador
Argentine expatriates in Ecuador
Argentine expatriate sportspeople in Chile
Argentine expatriates in Chile
Association football defenders
Argentine football managers
Primera B de Chile managers
Chilean Primera División managers
Sportspeople from Buenos Aires Province